Chingachgook, die große Schlange is an East German Western film. It was released in 1967, and sold 5,077,070 tickets. The title translates to Chingachgook, the Great Serpent, and starred Gojko Mitić as Chingachgook.

Plot

Cast

References

External links
 

1967 films
1967 Western (genre) films
East German films
Films based on works by James Fenimore Cooper
Films shot in Bulgaria
1960s German-language films
German Western (genre) films
Ostern films
Films directed by Richard Groschopp
Films set in the 1740s
1960s German films